Emine Mebrure Aksoley (10 August 1902 – 2 March 1984) was a Turkish educator, philanthropist, politician, women's rights activist, member of parliament, and senator.

Early life, education, and family
Emine Mebrure was born on 10 August 1902, daughter to Turkish parents Halit Sezai (Güran), a retired major of the Ottoman Army Corps of Engineers, and his spouse Fatma in Thessaloniki, then Ottoman Empire. She lived in Thessaloniki until the outbreak of Balkan Wars in 1912. The family moved then to Anatolia, and she lived in Bandırma and Alaşehir due to her father's duty in the military right after the beginning of World War I.

She completed elementary school in Bandırma and middle school at İzmir High School for Girls. She completed her secondary education at Üsküdar Çamlıca High School for Girls in Istanbul. The family settled in Ankara when her father joined the Turkish War of Independence (1919–1922).

In 1923, she married Ahmet İhsan (Aksoley) (1899–1975), who would be an engineer and officer of the Turkish Army and retired as a Brigadier. Due to her husband's higher education abroad, she lived a long time in Germany, and also spent some time in France, England, and Hungary. She conducted research on social institutions during her stay in Germany.

After returning home, she attended Ankara University Law School and graduated with distinction in 1938. She started a career as an educator, opening a private elementary school in Çankaya district of Ankara.

Social activist
In 1938, she entered the "Village Affairs" branch at Ankara Halkevi. The next year, she collaborated with the relief committee for the victims of the 1939 Erzincan earthquake. Between 1940 and 1941, Aksolay was a member of the "Yardımseverler Cemiyeti" ("Philanthropists Association"), and served as its secretary general and vice chairperson.

Aksoley was among the founders of the "Türk Kadınlar Birliği" ("Turkish Women's Union") during its re-establishment on 13 April 1949. The organization had been founded on 7 February 1924, but dissolved itself after the 1935 Turkish general election when they were satisfied with the swearing-in of 18 women politicians in the parliament. Between 1949 and 1951, Aksoley served as the chairperson of the organization.

Politician
Aksoley entered politics in 1928 as a member of the Republican People's Party (CHP). She served as a Deputy of Ankara in two terms, the 7th (1943–1946) and the 8th parliament (1946–1950), of the Turkish Grand National Assembly (TBMM). During her membership, she served on several parliamentary committees.

After her tenure in the TBMM, Aksoley took charge of several administrative posts in the CHP, and continued her involvement in social activities.

In 1961, Aksoley was appointed to the Constituent Assembly of Turkey, established by the military rule of 1960 Turkish coup d'état, representing CHP. She was elected to the Senate of the Republic as a Deputy of Istanbul from CHP at the 1/3 Senate renewal after the 1964 Turkish Senate election, and served at this post until 1973. She was part of the parliamentary delegation that officially visited Yugoslavia in September 1967.

Writer
Aksoley wrote articles defending women's rights and Atatürk's principles in the CHP-owned newspaper Ulus.  In 1970, she wrote about her 42-year political career in the CHP in a book titled C.H.P de 42 Yıllık Çalışmalarımdan Bazı Örnekler (Some Examples From My 42 Years of Work at C.H.P).

Death
Aksoley died on 2 March 1984, aged 81.

References

1902 births
People from Thessaloniki
Ankara University Faculty of Law alumni
Turkish schoolteachers
Turkish philanthropists
20th-century Turkish women politicians
Turkish women's rights activists
Republican People's Party (Turkey) politicians
Ulus (newspaper) people
Members of the 7th Parliament of Turkey
Members of the 8th Parliament of Turkey
Deputies of Ankara
Members of the Constituent Assembly of Turkey
Members of the Senate of the Republic (Turkey)
1984 deaths